Ján Podmanický  (born 17 May 1977) is a Slovak politician. He has served as a member of the National Council since 2006. He has also been the Mayor of his home village of Stará Bystrica since 2003. For most of his political career, he has been a member of the Direction – Slovak Social Democracy party.

In 2020 he joined fellow MPs Marián Kéry and Tomáš Taraba to establish a Conservative Platform. He subsequently left Direction – Slovak Social Democracy, which he has been a member of since the beginning of his political career and became an independent MP. Podmanický justified his departure by his unwillingness to accept the leftward shift of the party ideology.

Podmanický studied Theology and Law at the Comenius University. He has three children.

References 

Direction – Social Democracy politicians
Comenius University alumni
Living people
1977 births
Members of the National Council (Slovakia) 2006-2010
Members of the National Council (Slovakia) 2010-2012
Members of the National Council (Slovakia) 2012-2016
Members of the National Council (Slovakia) 2016-2020
Members of the National Council (Slovakia) 2020-present
People from Čadca District